Peepers is a 2010 film directed by Seth W. Owen and co-written with Daniel Perlmutter and Mark Slutsky.

Cast
Joe Cobden as Steve Sherman
Janine Theriault as Annette Fulvish
Paul Spence as Peter
Howard Bilerman as Neal
Ricky Mabe as Bobby
Dan Beirne as Stu
Tyrone Benskin as Helman
Jessica Paré as Helen

External links
 

2010 films
Canadian comedy films
English-language Canadian films
2010 comedy films
Films set in Montreal
Films about security and surveillance
2010s English-language films
2010s Canadian films